A satellite bus (or spacecraft bus) is the main body and structural component of a satellite or spacecraft, in which the payload and all scientific instruments are held. 

Bus-derived satellites are opposed to specially produced satellites. Bus-derived satellites are usually customized to customer requirements, for example with specialized sensors or transponders, in order to achieve a specific mission.

They are commonly used for geosynchronous satellites, particularly communications satellites, but are also used in spacecraft which occupy lower orbits, occasionally including low Earth orbit missions.

Examples

Some satellite bus examples include:
 Boeing DS&S 702
 Lockheed Martin Space Systems A2100
 Alphabus
 INVAP ARSAT-3K
 Airbus D&S Eurostar
 ISRO's I-1K, I-2K, I-3K, I-4K, I-6K, and Indian Mini Satellite bus
 NASA Ames MCSB
 SSL 1300
 Orbital ATK GEOStar
 Mitsubishi Electric DS2000
 Spacecraft bus of the James Webb Space Telescope
 SPUTNIX TabletSat
 SPUTNIX OrbiCraft-Pro

Components

A bus typically consists of the following subsystems:
 Command and data handling (C&DH) system
 Communications system and antennas
 Electrical power system (EPS)
 Propulsion
 Thermal control
 Attitude control system (ACS)
 Guidance, navigation, and control (GNC) system
 Structures and trusses
 Life support (for crewed missions).

See also
 Comparison of satellite buses
 Service module
 Satellite

References

External links
 Satellite Glossary
 JWST Observatory: The Spacecraft Bus
 Spitzer's Spacecraft Bus
 Gunter's Space Page: Spacecraft buses

 

es:Satélite artificial#Modelo de satélite